The women's shot put event was, for the first time, part of the track and field athletics programme at the 1948 Summer Olympics. The competition was held on 4 August 1948.  The final was won by Micheline Ostermeyer of France.

Since it was the first time this event took place, the following new Olympic record was set during this competition:

Schedule

All times are British Summer Time (UTC+1)

Qualifying round

Qual. rule: qualification standard 12.30m (Q) or at least best 12 qualified (q).

Final standings

Key:  OR = Olympic record

References

External links
Organising Committee for the XIV Olympiad, The (1948). The Official Report of the Organising Committee for the XIV Olympiad. LA84 Foundation. Retrieved 5 September 2016.

Athletics at the 1948 Summer Olympics
Shot put at the Olympics
1948 in women's athletics
Ath